Black Cypress Bayou is a  river in Texas.  It is a tributary of Big Cypress Bayou and is part of the Red River watershed.

See also
List of rivers of Texas

References

USGS Hydrologic Unit Map - State of Texas (1974)

Rivers of Texas
Tributaries of the Red River of the South